
British NVC community MG1, Arrhenatherum elatius grassland, is one of the mesotrophic grassland communities in the British National Vegetation Classification system. This type of plant community was named in 1919 as Arrhenatheretum elatioris Br.-Bl.. It is a very widespread community throughout the British lowlands of England, Wales and southern and eastern Scotland. 

The following constant species are found in this community:
 False Oat-grass (Arrhenatherum elatius)
 Cock's-foot (Dactylis glomerata)

One rare species, Nottingham Catchfly (Silene nutans), is associated with this community.

Subcommunities

There are five subcommunities, and two of these have been further subdivided into a number of variants:
 the Festuca rubra subcommunity, subdivided into:
 a Centaurea scabiosa variant
 a Geranium pratense variant
 a Bromus sterilis variant
 a Myrrhis odorata variant
 an Epilobium angustifolium variant
 the Urtica dioica subcommunity, subdivided into:
 a Papaver rhoeas variant
 an Artemisia vulgaris variant
 an Epilobium hirsutum variant
 the Filipendula ulmaria subcommunity
 the Pastinaca sativa subcommunity
 the Centaurea nigra subcommunity

References

 Rodwell, J. S. (1992) British Plant Communities Volume 3 - Grasslands and montane communities  (hardback),  (paperback)

MG01